Allograpta robinsoni is a two-winged species of hoverfly found on the Malay peninsula, first described by Charles Howard Curran in 1928. It is an oriental species in the Allograpta obliqua species group.

References

Syrphini
Insects described in 1928
Diptera of North America
Taxa named by Charles Howard Curran